The Sankrail railway station in the Indian state of West Bengal, serves Sankrail, India in Howrah district. It is on the Howrah–Kharagpur line.

History
The Howrah–Kharagpur line was opened in 1900.

Tracks
The Howrah–Panskura stretch has three lines.

Electrification
The Howrah–Kharagpur line was electrified in 1967–69.

Incidents 
The station has been vandalized recently by protesters against the Citizenship (Amendment) Act. The anti-Citizenship (Amendment) Act agitators had set ablaze the station's ticket counter and signal room.

References

External links
Trains at Sankrail

Railway stations in Howrah district
Kolkata Suburban Railway stations